The Bushwick Avenue–Aberdeen Street station is a station on the BMT Canarsie Line of the New York City Subway. Located in Bushwick, Brooklyn, it is served by the L train at all times.

History

Bushwick Avenue–Aberdeen Street, opened on July 14, 1928, as part of an extension of the Canarsie Line. This extension connected Montrose Avenue, which had opened four years earlier, to Broadway Junction, which was the western end of the already-operating elevated line to Canarsie.

Station layout

This station has two tracks and two side platforms. The side platforms are slightly curved and the two tracks are at different levels at the north end of the station, with the southbound tracks being higher due to their descent from an elevated stretch at Wilson Avenue.

Parchment brown replacement tiles can be observed. The pillars are covered in white tile, with mosaics on each one bearing the station's name, "Bushwick Aberdeen". The elaborate porcelain mosaic band is predominantly tan, peach, mauve and brown with yellow, cream, green, rosy beige, slate blue, indigo and black grape tiles in the center. In the mezzanine, there are also bright aqua tiles, as well as the above-mentioned brown replacements.

Exit
The single entrance to this underground station is in a small building on the north side of Bushwick Avenue between Aberdeen Street and DeSales Place.

References

External links 

 
 Station Reporter — 
 The Subway Nut — Bushwick Avenue–Aberdeen Street Pictures 
 Bushwick Avenue entrance from Google Maps Street View
 Platforms from Google Maps Street View

BMT Canarsie Line stations
New York City Subway stations in Brooklyn
Railway stations in the United States opened in 1928
1928 establishments in New York City
Bushwick, Brooklyn